Taher Zakaria (born 1988) is Qatari footballer who is a defender . He is a member of the Qatar national football team.

References 

1988 births
Living people
Qatari footballers
Qatar international footballers
Al Sadd SC players
Al-Shamal SC players
Al-Rayyan SC players
Al Ahli SC (Doha) players
Al-Shahania SC players
Qatar Stars League players
Qatari Second Division players
Association football defenders